Saeed Al-Zahrani (born 1 July 1995) is a Saudi Arabian professional footballer who plays as a winger for Saudi Professional League side Al-Ain.

Career
Al-Zahrani started his career at the youth team of Al-Ain and represented the club at every level. On 18 July 2019, Al-Zahrani joined Ohod. On 1 February 2020, after making no appearances for Ohod, Al-Zahrani return to Al-Ain. Al-Zahrani achieved promotion with Al-Ain to the Pro League for the first time in the club's history.

References

External links
 

1995 births
Living people
Saudi Arabian footballers
Association football wingers
Al-Ain FC (Saudi Arabia) players
Ohod Club players
Saudi Fourth Division players
Saudi Second Division players
Saudi First Division League players
Saudi Professional League players